Amazon SageMaker is a cloud machine-learning platform that was launched in November 2017. SageMaker enables developers to create, train, and deploy machine-learning (ML) models in the cloud. SageMaker also enables developers to deploy ML models on embedded systems and edge-devices.

Capabilities 
SageMaker enables developers to operate at a number of levels of abstraction when training and deploying machine learning models. At its highest level of abstraction, SageMaker provides pre-trained ML models that can be deployed as-is. In addition, SageMaker provides a number of built-in ML algorithms that developers can train on their own data. Further, SageMaker provides managed instances of TensorFlow and Apache MXNet, where developers can create their own ML algorithms from scratch. Regardless of which level of abstraction is used, a developer can connect their SageMaker-enabled ML models to other AWS services, such as the Amazon DynamoDB database for structured data storage, AWS Batch for offline batch processing, or Amazon Kinesis for real-time processing.

Development interfaces 
A number of interfaces are available for developers to interact with SageMaker. First, there is a web API that remotely controls a SageMaker server instance. While the web API is agnostic to the programming language used by the developer, Amazon provides SageMaker API bindings for a number of languages, including Python, JavaScript, Ruby, Java, and Go. In addition, SageMaker provides managed Jupyter Notebook instances for interactively programming SageMaker and other applications.

History and features 

 2017-11-29: SageMaker is launched at the AWS re:Invent conference.
 2018-02-27: Managed TensorFlow and MXNet deep neural network training and inference are now supported within SageMaker.
2018-02-28: SageMaker automatically scales model inference to multiple server instances.
2018-07-13: SageMaker adds support for recurrent neural network training, word2vec training, multi-class linear learner training, and distributed deep neural network training in Chainer with Layer-wise Adaptive Rate Scaling (LARS).
2018-07-17: AWS Batch Transform enables high-throughput non-realtime machine learning inference in SageMaker.
2018-11-08: Support for training and inference of Object2Vec word embeddings.
2018-11-27: SageMaker Ground Truth "makes it much easier for developers to label their data using human annotators through Mechanical Turk, third-party vendors, or their own employees."
2018-11-28: SageMaker Reinforcement Learning (RL) "enables developers and data scientists to quickly and easily develop reinforcement learning models at scale."
2018-11-28: SageMaker Neo enables deep neural network models to be deployed from SageMaker to edge-devices such as smartphones and smart cameras.
2018-11-29: The AWS Marketplace for SageMaker is launched. The AWS Marketplace enables 3rd-party developers to buy and sell machine learning models that can be trained and deployed in SageMaker.
2019-01-27: SageMaker Neo is released as open-source software.

Uses 

 NASCAR is using SageMaker to train deep neural networks on 70 years of video data.
Carsales.com uses SageMaker to train and deploy machine learning models to analyze and approve automotive classified ad listings.
Avis Budget Group and Slalom Consulting are using SageMaker to develop "a practical on-site solution that could address the over- and under-utilization of cars in real-time using an optimization engine built in Amazon SageMaker."
Volkswagen Group uses SageMaker to develop and deploy machine learning in its manufacturing plants.
Peak and Footasylum use SageMaker in a recommendation engine for footwear.

Favorable articles on SageMaker 
In 2019, CIOL named SageMaker one of the "5 Best Machine Learning Platforms For Developers," alongside IBM Watson, Microsoft Azure Machine Learning, Apache PredictionIO, and ai-one.

See also 

 Amazon Web Services
 Amazon Lex
 Amazon Polly
Amazon Rekognition
Amazon Mechanical Turk
Timeline of Amazon Web Services

References 

Amazon (company)
Amazon Web Services
Cloud infrastructure
2017 software
Deep learning software